A repeating decimal or recurring decimal is decimal representation of a number whose digits are periodic (repeating its values at regular intervals) and the infinitely repeated portion is not zero. It can be shown that a number is rational if and only if its decimal representation is repeating or terminating (i.e. all except finitely many digits are zero). For example, the decimal representation of  becomes periodic just after the decimal point, repeating the single digit "3" forever, i.e. 0.333.... At present, there is no single universally accepted notation or phrasing for repeating decimals.

The infinitely repeated digit sequence is called the repetend or reptend. If the repetend is a zero, this decimal representation is called a terminating decimal rather than a repeating decimal, since the zeros can be omitted and the decimal terminates before these zeros. Every terminating decimal representation can be written as a decimal fraction, a fraction whose denominator is a power of 10 (e.g. ); it may also be written as a ratio of the form  (e.g. ). However, every number with a terminating decimal representation also trivially has a second, alternative representation as a repeating decimal whose repetend is the digit 9. This is obtained by decreasing the final (rightmost) non-zero digit by one and appending a repetend of 9. (This type of repeating decimal can be obtained by long division if one uses a modified form of the usual division algorithm.)

Any number that cannot be expressed as a ratio of two integers is said to be irrational. Their decimal representation neither terminates nor infinitely repeats, but extends forever without repetition (see ).

Background

Notation

There are several notational conventions for representing repeating decimals. None of them are accepted universally.

In the United States, Canada, India, France, Germany, Italy, Switzerland, the Czech Republic, Slovakia, and Turkey the convention is to draw a horizontal line (a vinculum) above the repetend. (See examples in table below, column Vinculum.)
In the United Kingdom, New Zealand, Australia, India, South Korea, and mainland China, the convention is to place dots above the outermost numerals of the repetend. (See examples in table below, column Dots.)
In parts of Europe, Vietnam and Russia, the convention is to enclose the repetend in parentheses. (See examples in table below, column Parentheses.) This can cause confusion with the notation for standard uncertainty.
In Spain and some Latin American countries, the arc notation over the repetend is also used as an alternative to the vinculum and the dots notation. (See examples in table below, column Arc.)
Informally, repeating decimals are often represented by an ellipsis (three periods, 0.333...), especially when the previous notational conventions are first taught in school. This notation introduces uncertainty as to which digits should be repeated and even whether repetition is occurring at all, since such ellipses are also employed for irrational numbers; π, for example, can be represented as 3.14159....

In English, there are various ways to read repeating decimals aloud. For example, 1.2 may be read "one point two repeating three four", "one point two repeated three four", "one point two recurring three four", "one point two repetend three four" or "one point two into infinity three four".

Decimal expansion and recurrence sequence
In order to convert a rational number represented as a fraction into decimal form, one may use long division. For example, consider the rational number :
         0.0
    74 ) 5.00000
         4.44
           560
           518
            420
            370
             500

etc. Observe that at each step we have a remainder; the successive remainders displayed above are 56, 42, 50. When we arrive at 50 as the remainder, and bring down the "0", we find ourselves dividing 500 by 74, which is the same problem we began with. Therefore, the decimal repeats: .....

Every rational number is either a terminating or repeating decimal
For any given divisor, only finitely many different remainders can occur. In the example above, the 74 possible remainders are 0, 1, 2, ..., 73. If at any point in the division the remainder is 0, the expansion terminates at that point. Then the length of the repetend, also called "period", is defined to be 0.

If 0 never occurs as a remainder, then the division process continues forever, and eventually, a remainder must occur that has occurred before. The next step in the division will yield the same new digit in the quotient, and the same new remainder, as the previous time the remainder was the same. Therefore, the following division will repeat the same results. The repeating sequence of digits is called "repetend" which has a certain length greater than 0, also called "period".

Every repeating or terminating decimal is a rational number
Each repeating decimal number satisfies a linear equation with integer coefficients, and its unique solution is a rational number. The process of how to find these integer coefficients is described below.

Table of values
<div><ul> 
 
 
 

Thereby fraction is the unit fraction  and ℓ10 is the length of the (decimal) repetend.

0, 0, 1, 0, 0, 1, 6, 0, 1, 0, 2, 1, 6, 6, 1, 0, 16, 1, 18, 0, 6, 2, 22, 1, 0, 6, 3, 6, 28, 1, 15, 0, 2, 16, 6, 1, 3, 18, 6, 0, 5, 6, 21, 2, 1, 22, 46, 1, 42, 0, 16, 6, 13, 3, 2, 6, 18, 28, 58, 1, 60, 15, 6, 0, 6, 2, 33, 16, 22, 6, 35, 1, 8, 3, 1, ... .

For comparison, the lengths ℓ2(n) of the binary repetends of the fractions , n = 1, 2, 3, ..., are:
0, 0, 2, 0, 4, 2, 3, 0, 6, 4, 10, 2, 12, 3, 4, 0, 8, 6, 18, 4, 6, 10, 11, 2, 20, 12, 18, 3, 28, 4, 5, 0, 10, 8, 12, 6, 36, 18, 12, 4, 20, 6, 14, 10, 12, 11, ... (=[n], if n not a power of 2 else =0).

0, 0, 3, 0, 0, 6, 142857, 0, 1, 0, 09, 3, 076923, 714285, 6, 0, 0588235294117647, 5, 052631578947368421, 0, 047619, 45, 0434782608695652173913, 6, 0, 384615, 037, 571428, 0344827586206896551724137931, 3, ... .

(nth prime), are:
0, 1, 0, 6, 2, 6, 16, 18, 22, 28, 15, 3, 5, 21, 46, 13, 58, 60, 33, 35, 8, 13, 41, 44, 96, 4, 34, 53, 108, 112, 42, 130, 8, 46, 148, 75, 78, 81, 166, 43, 178, 180, 95, 192, 98, 99, 30, 222, 113, 228, 232, 7, 30, 50, 256, 262, 268, 5, 69, 28, ... .

The least primes p for which  has decimal repetend length n, n = 1, 2, 3, ..., are:
3, 11, 37, 101, 41, 7, 239, 73, 333667, 9091, 21649, 9901, 53, 909091, 31, 17, 2071723, 19, 1111111111111111111, 3541, 43, 23, 11111111111111111111111, 99990001, 21401, 859, 757, 29, 3191, 211, ... .

The least primes p for which  has n different cycles, n = 1, 2, 3, ..., are:
7, 3, 103, 53, 11, 79, 211, 41, 73, 281, 353, 37, 2393, 449, 3061, 1889, 137, 2467, 16189, 641, 3109, 4973, 11087, 1321, 101, 7151, 7669, 757, 38629, 1231, ... .

Fractions with prime denominators
A fraction in lowest terms with a prime denominator other than 2 or 5 (i.e. coprime to 10) always produces a repeating decimal. If 10 is a primitive root modulo p, then the repetend length is equal to p − 1; if not, then the repetend length is a factor of p − 1. This result can be deduced from Fermat's little theorem, which states that .

The base-10 digital root of the repetend of the reciprocal of any prime number greater than 5 is 9.

Cyclic numbers

Examples of fractions belonging to this group are:
 = 0., 6 repeating digits
 = 0., 16 repeating digits
 = 0., 18 repeating digits
 = 0., 22 repeating digits
 = 0., 28 repeating digits
 = 0., 46 repeating digits
 = 0., 58 repeating digits
 = 0., 60 repeating digits
 = 0., 96 repeating digits

Every proper multiple of a cyclic number (that is, a multiple having the same number of digits) is a rotation:

 = 1 × 0.142857... = 0.142857...
 = 2 × 0.142857... = 0.285714...
 = 3 × 0.142857... = 0.428571...
 = 4 × 0.142857... = 0.571428...
 = 5 × 0.142857... = 0.714285...
 = 6 × 0.142857... = 0.857142...

The reason for the cyclic behavior is apparent from an arithmetic exercise of long division of : the sequential remainders are the cyclic sequence . See also the article 142,857 for more properties of this cyclic number.

A fraction which is cyclic thus has a recurring decimal of even length that divides into two sequences in nines' complement form. For example  starts '142' and is followed by '857' while  (by rotation) starts '857' followed by its nines' complement '142'.

The rotation of the repetend of a cyclic number always happens in such a way that each successive repetend is a bigger number than the previous one. In the succession above, for instance, we see that 0.142857... < 0.285714... < 0.428571... < 0.571428... < 0.714285... < 0.857142.... This, for cyclic fractions with long repetends, allows us to easily predict what the result of multiplying the fraction by any natural number n will be, as long as the repetend is known.

A proper prime is a prime p which ends in the digit 1 in base 10 and whose reciprocal in base 10 has a repetend with length p − 1. In such primes, each digit 0, 1,..., 9 appears in the repeating sequence the same number of times as does each other digit (namely,  times). They are:
61, 131, 181, 461, 491, 541, 571, 701, 811, 821, 941, 971, 1021, 1051, 1091, 1171, 1181, 1291, 1301, 1349, 1381, 1531, 1571, 1621, 1741, 1811, 1829, 1861,... .

A prime is a proper prime if and only if it is a full reptend prime and congruent to 1 mod 10.

If a prime p is both full reptend prime and safe prime, then  will produce a stream of p − 1 pseudo-random digits. Those primes are
7, 23, 47, 59, 167, 179, 263, 383, 503, 863, 887, 983, 1019, 1367, 1487, 1619, 1823,... .

Other reciprocals of primes
Some reciprocals of primes that do not generate cyclic numbers are:
 = 0., which has a period (repetend length) of 1.
 = 0., which has a period of 2.
 = 0., which has a period of 6.
 = 0., which has a period of 15.
 = 0., which has a period of 3.
 = 0., which has a period of 5.
 = 0., which has a period of 21.
 = 0., which has a period of 13.
 = 0., which has a period of 33.

The reason is that 3 is a divisor of 9, 11 is a divisor of 99, 41 is a divisor of 99999, etc.
Since the period is never greater than p − 1, we can obtain this by calculating . For example, for 11 we get

and then by inspection find the repetend 09 and period of 2.

Those reciprocals of primes can be associated with several sequences of repeating decimals. For example, the multiples of  can be divided into two sets, with different repetends. The first set is:

 = 0.076923...
 = 0.769230...
 = 0.692307...
 = 0.923076...
 = 0.230769...
 = 0.307692...,

where the repetend of each fraction is a cyclic re-arrangement of 076923. The second set is:

 = 0.153846...
 = 0.538461...
 = 0.384615...
 = 0.846153...
 = 0.461538...
 = 0.615384...,

where the repetend of each fraction is a cyclic re-arrangement of 153846.

In general, the set of proper multiples of reciprocals of a prime p consists of n subsets, each with repetend length k, where nk = p − 1.

Totient rule
For an arbitrary integer n, the length L(n) of the decimal repetend of  divides φ(n), where φ is the totient function. The length is equal to  if and only if 10 is a primitive root modulo n.

In particular, it follows that  if and only if p is a prime and 10 is a primitive root modulo p. Such numbers p are called full repetend primes.

Reciprocals of composite integers coprime to 10
If p is a prime other than 2 or 5, the decimal representation of the fraction  repeats:
 = 0..

The period (repetend length) L(49) must be a factor of λ(49) = 42, where λ(n) is known as the Carmichael function. This follows from Carmichael's theorem which states that if n is a positive integer then λ(n) is the smallest integer m such that

for every integer a that is coprime to n.

These three primes are 3, 487, and 56598313 .

If p and q are primes other than 2 or 5, the decimal representation of the fraction  repeats. An example is :
119 = 7 × 17
λ(7 × 17) = LCM(λ(7), λ(17)) = LCM(6, 16) = 48,

where LCM denotes the least common multiple.

 = 0..

If p, q, r, etc. are primes other than 2 or 5, and k, ℓ, m, etc. are positive integers, then

is a repeating decimal with a period of

Reciprocals of integers not coprime to 10
An integer that is not coprime to 10 but has a prime factor other than 2 or 5 has a reciprocal that is eventually periodic, but with a non-repeating sequence of digits that precede the repeating part. The reciprocal can be expressed as:

where a and b are not both zero.

This fraction can also be expressed as:

if a > b, or as

if b > a, or as

if a = b.

The decimal has:
An initial transient of max(a, b) digits after the decimal point. Some or all of the digits in the transient can be zeros.
A subsequent repetend which is the same as that for the fraction .

For example  = 0.03:
a = 2, b = 0, and the other factors 
there are 2 initial non-repeating digits, 03; and
there are 6 repeating digits, 571428, the same amount as  has.

Converting repeating decimals to fractions
Given a repeating decimal, it is possible to calculate the fraction that produces it. For example:

{|
|-
|style="text-align:right;width:3em"| ||style="width:12em"| 
|-
|style="text-align:right"| || || (multiply each side of the above line by 10)
|-
|style="text-align:right"| || || (subtract the 1st line from the 2nd)
|-
|style="text-align:right"| || || (reduce to lowest terms)
|}

Another example:

{|
|-
|style="text-align:right;width:3em"| ||style="width:12em"| 
|-
|style="text-align:right"| || || (move decimal to start of repetition = move by 1 place = multiply by 10)
|-
|style="text-align:right"| || || (collate 2nd repetition here with 1st above = move by 2 places = multiply by 100)
|-
|style="text-align:right"| || || (subtract to clear decimals)
|-
|style="text-align:right"| || || (reduce to lowest terms)
|}

A shortcut
The procedure below can be applied in particular if the repetend has n digits, all of which are 0 except the final one which is 1. For instance for n = 7:

So this particular repeating decimal corresponds to the fraction , where the denominator is the number written as n 9s. Knowing just that, a general repeating decimal can be expressed as a fraction without having to solve an equation. For example, one could reason:

It is possible to get a general formula expressing a repeating decimal with an n-digit period (repetend length), beginning right after the decimal point, as a fraction:

More explicitly, one gets the following cases:

If the repeating decimal is between 0 and 1, and the repeating block is n digits long, first occurring right after the decimal point, then the fraction (not necessarily reduced) will be the integer number represented by the n-digit block divided by the one represented by n 9s. For example,
0.444444... =  since the repeating block is 4 (a 1-digit block),
0.565656... =  since the repeating block is 56 (a 2-digit block),
0.999999... =  = 1, since the repeating block is 9 (also a 1-digit block)

If the repeating decimal is as above, except that there are k (extra) digits 0 between the decimal point and the repeating n-digit block, then one can simply add k digits 0 after the n digits 9 of the denominator (and, as before, the fraction may subsequently be simplified). For example,
0.000444... =  since the repeating block is 4 and this block is preceded by 3 zeros,
0.005656... =  since the repeating block is 56 and it is preceded by 2 zeros,
0.00012012... =  =  since the repeating block is 012 and it is preceded by 2 zeros.

Any repeating decimal not of the form described above can be written as a sum of a terminating decimal and a repeating decimal of one of the two above types (actually the first type suffices, but that could require the terminating decimal to be negative). For example,
1.23444... = 1.23 + 0.00444... =  +  =  +  = 
or alternatively 1.23444... = 0.79 + 0.44444... =  +  =  +  = 
0.3789789... = 0.3 + 0.0789789... =  +  =  +  =  = 
or alternatively 0.3789789... = −0.6 + 0.9789789... = − + 978/999 = − +  =  = 

An even faster method is to ignore the decimal point completely and go like this
1.23444... =  =  (denominator has one 9 and two 0s because one digit repeats and there are two non-repeating digits after the decimal point)
0.3789789... =  =  (denominator has three 9s and one 0 because three digits repeat and there is one non-repeating digit after the decimal point)

It follows that any repeating decimal with period n, and k digits after the decimal point that do not belong to the repeating part, can be written as a (not necessarily reduced) fraction whose denominator is (10n − 1)10k.

Conversely the period of the repeating decimal of a fraction  will be (at most) the smallest number n such that 10n − 1 is divisible by d.

For example, the fraction  has d = 7, and the smallest k that makes 10k − 1 divisible by 7 is k = 6, because 999999 = 7 × 142857. The period of the fraction  is therefore 6.

In compressed form
The following picture suggests kind of compression of the above shortcut.
Thereby  represents the digits of the integer part of the decimal number (to the left of the decimal point),  makes up the string of digits of the preperiod and  its length, and  being the string of repeated digits (the period) with length  which is nonzero.

In the generated fraction, the digit  will be repeated  times, and the digit  will be repeated  times.

Note that in the absence of an integer part in the decimal,  will be represented by zero, which being to the left of the other digits, will not affect the final result, and may be omitted in the calculation of the generating function.

Examples:

The symbol  in the examples above denotes the absence of digits of part  in the decimal, and therefore  and a corresponding absence in the generated fraction.

Repeating decimals as infinite series
A repeating decimal can also be expressed as an infinite series. That is, a repeating decimal can be regarded as the sum of an infinite number of rational numbers. To take the simplest example,

Because the absolute value of the common factor is less than 1, we can say that the geometric series converges and find the exact value in the form of a fraction by using the following formula where a is the first term of the series and r is the common factor.

Similarly,

Multiplication and cyclic permutation

The cyclic behavior of repeating decimals in multiplication also leads to the construction of integers which are cyclically permuted when multiplied by certain numbers.

Other properties of repetend lengths
Various properties of repetend lengths (periods) are given by Mitchell and Dickson.

If p is prime, the period of  divides evenly into p − 1.
For prime p, if

for some m, but

then for c ≥ 0 we have

For some other properties of repetends, see also.

Extension to other bases
Various features of repeating decimals extend to the representation of numbers in all other integer bases, not just base 10:

Any real number can be represented as an integer part followed by a radix point (the generalization of a decimal point to non-decimal systems) followed by a finite or infinite number of digits.
If the base is an integer, a terminating sequence obviously represents a rational number.
A rational number has a terminating sequence if all the prime factors of the denominator of the fully reduced fractional form are also factors of the base.
If the positional numeral system is a standard one, that is it has base

combined with a consecutive set of digits

In the decimal system, for example, there is 0. = 1. = 1; in the balanced ternary system there is 0. = 1. = .
A rational number has an indefinitely repeating sequence of finite length , if the reduced fraction's denominator contains a prime factor that is not a factor of the base. If  is the maximal factor of the reduced denominator which is coprime to the base,  is the smallest exponent such that  divides . The repeating sequence is preceded by a transient of finite length if the reduced fraction also shares a prime factor with the base. A repeating sequence

represents the fraction

An irrational number has a representation of infinite length that is not, from any point, an indefinitely repeating sequence of finite length.

For example, in duodecimal,  = 0.6,  = 0.4,  = 0.3 and  = 0.2 all terminate;  = 0. repeats with period length 4, in contrast with the equivalent decimal expansion of 0.2;  = 0. has period 6 in duodecimal, just as it does in decimal.

For example  in duodecimal:
 = ( +  +  +  +  +  + ...)base12
which is 0.base12. 10base12 is 12base10, 102base12 is 144base10, 21base12 is 25base10, A5base12 is 125base10.

Algorithm for positive bases 
For a rational  (and base ) there is the following algorithm producing the repetend together with its length:
function b_adic(b,p,q) // b ≥ 2; 0 < p < q
  static digits = "0123..."; // up to the digit with value b–1
begin
  s = "";  // the string of digits
  pos = 0; // all places are right to the radix point
  while not defined(occurs[p]) do
    occurs[p] = pos; // the position of the place with remainder p
    bp = b*p;
    z = floor(bp/q); // index z of digit within: 0 ≤ z ≤ b-1
    p = b*p − z*q;   // 0 ≤ p < q
    if p = 0 then L = 0;
      if not z = 0 then
        s = s . substring(digits, z, 1) 
      end if
      return (s);
     end if
    s = s . substring(digits, z, 1); // append the character of the digit
    pos += 1;
  end while
  L = pos - occurs[p]; // the length of the repetend (being < q)
  // mark the digits of the repetend by a vinculum:
  for i from occurs[p] to pos-1 do
    substring(s, i, 1) = overline(substring(s, i, 1));
  end for
  return (s);
end function
The first highlighted line calculates the digit .

The subsequent line calculates the new remainder  of the division modulo the denominator . As a consequence of the floor function floor we have
 
thus
 
and
 
Such a recurrence is detected by the associative array occurs. The new digit  is formed in the yellow line, where  is the only non-constant. The length  of the repetend equals the number of the remainders (see also section Every rational number is either a terminating or repeating decimal).

Applications to cryptography
Repeating decimals (also called decimal sequences) have found cryptographic and error-correction coding applications. In these applications repeating decimals to base 2 are generally used which gives rise to binary sequences.

The randomness of these sequences has been examined by diehard tests.

See also
Decimal representation
Full reptend prime
Midy's theorem
Parasitic number
Trailing zero
Unique prime
0.999..., a repeating decimal equal to one
Pigeonhole principle

References and remarks

External links

Elementary arithmetic
Numeral systems

de:Rationale Zahl#Dezimalbruchentwicklung